Lakeland Industries Inc. is a publicly held global manufacturer of personal protective clothing and safety apparel. Its products include cleanroom coveralls, disposable protective clothing, chemical protective suits, firefighting turnouts, aluminized heat protective apparel, flame resistant/arc resistant clothing, high visibility clothing, and protective gloves and sleeves.

Lakeland Industries was founded in 1982 by Raymond J. Smith. Between 1982 and 1986, it focused on two product lines: disposable, limited use protective industrial garments and specialty work gloves. In December 1986, shortly after raising funds through its first stock offering, Lakeland expanded into the chemical and fire safety markets. In 1994, the company entered the Canadian sales market. Since then, Lakeland has expanded sales into more than 50 countries around the world.

Lakeland serves companies in more than a dozen industrial sectors, including petrochemical, pharmaceutical compounding, mining, construction, utilities, and fire service, among others. Additionally, it is a vendor to federal, state, and local governments, as well as federal agencies including the United States Department of Defense, United States Department of Homeland Security and the Centers for Disease Control and Prevention.

Lakeland's limited use, disposable protective clothing guards against common industrial contaminants and irritants, including fertilizers, pesticides, acids, asbestos, and lead. Its protective woven reusable garments are used in hospitals and clean room environments, as well as by EMS personnel to protect against bacteria, viruses, and blood-borne pathogens. The company also produces high-end chemical protective suits used by hazardous material teams and chemical and nuclear industries personnel.

Lakeland owns and operates manufacturing facilities in Buenos Aires, Argentina; Nam Dinh Province, Vietnam; Zacatecas, Mexico; Uttar Pradesh State, India; and Weifang, China. The company sells its products through a network of thousands of worldwide safety product distributors. Its customers are industrial companies and government agencies from 40 countries including China, European Community, Canada, and the United States. Its competition includes companies such as DuPont, Kimberly Clark, Ansell, and Honeywell.

As of 2021, Lakeland's headquarters is based in Huntsville, Alabama. The company employs approximately 1,800 people worldwide, of which approximately 100 are employed in the U.S. and 1,700 are employed outside of the U.S. Its current CEO, Charles D. Roberson has served in the position since February 2020.

References 

American companies established in 1982
Companies listed on the Nasdaq
1982 establishments in New York (state)